Kala Suri Koddul Arachchige Wilson Perera (born 26 April 1926 – died 20 August 2006 as කොන්දුල් ආරච්චිගේ විල්සන් පෙරේරා) [Sinhala]), popularly known as K.A.W. Perera, was a director in Sri Lankan cinema. Considered as the pioneer of Sri Lankan public cinema, Perera was also a screenwriter, dialogue writer, lyricist and producer who contributed to Sri Lankan drama career for more than five decades.

He died on 20 August 2006 at the age of 80.

Personal life
K.A.W. Perera was born on 26 April 1926 in Havelock, Colombo. His father was Wilmot Perera and his mother was Vidanagamage Kavinihami Ratnayakege Nansina Perera. He first attended to Olcott College and passed English senior exam. He received his primary education at Boys Industrial Home School, Wellawatte and his secondary education at Ananda College, Colombo. Her mother was very strict on education, hence Perera studied well at the school and passed Junior School Certificate.

He was married to longtime partner Mihindukulasuriya Warnapeliyage Theresa Agnes Perera, who was a nurse. The couple has three children – Nayanananda Chandra Kumara, Jayantha Das Perera and Tamara Chandramali Perera.

Career

Early career
He started his career as an English Assistant Teacher at Biyanwila Government School. He also worked as a copywriter for Lanka Radio and as a program and feature designer, producer and children's program editor. Some of his popular radio dramas are Radio Theater and the detective drama Inspector Perera. met Agnes, his future wife during studies at a private institute to prepare University Entrance Examination. At that time, with arising financial problems, he continuously went Employment Exchange to find a job. After some days, he was hired as a clerk at the Education Department. While at the department, he wrote scripts for Radio Ceylon such as Jeewitha Sahathikaya and Rahas Parikshakaya produced by late Thevis Guruge and became popular. Praised by his Director of the Department, Perera was soon appointed as the Assistant English Teacher at a school in Biyanwala in 1949. In 1955, after few years of duty, he quit from the job and moved to Radio Ceylon as a full time writer and copywriter. He also produced radio programmes such as Handa Mama, Radio Sangarawa and Sinhala Geetha Dhara.

Cinema career
During his work at Radio Ceylon, Perera met renowned filmmaker Lester James Peries. Lester selected KAW as the dialogues writer for Sri Lanka’s first pure Sinhala film, Rekava. KAW also worked with Lester for the next film Sandesaya as dialogues writer. In 1960, he co-directed his debut film Pirimiyek Nisa along with T. Somasekaran. The film was produced by E. A. P. Edirisinghe. In 1963, he co-produced the film Suhada Sohoyuro with Edirisinghe. In 1966 he directed the film Sanasuma Kothanada and won the Sarasaviya award for the best film. He met his best friend Premalal Edirisinghe at Radio Ceylon during the production of Sandeshaya.

Since his debut, KAW made blockbuster milestones in Sinhala cinema history which includes Kapatikama, Bicycle Hora, Penawa Neda, Kathuru Muwath, Janaka Saha Manju, Lokuma Hinawa, Ihatha Athmaya, Aparadaya saha Danduwama, Lasanda and Undaya. Perera involved to introduce many talented faces to Sinhala cinema, whom became some major stars in coming ages. He introduced Geetha Kumarasinghe to silver screen through his film Wasana. Then he introduced Vijaya Nandasiri to cinema with Nedeyo. He introduced maestro Premasiri Khemadasa to cinema with Sanasuma Kothanada as well as lyricist Dharmasiri Gamage. With his final film Sumedha, renowned musician Rookantha Gunathilake has introduced into Sinhala cinema as musical director.

In 1956, he was honored at Taskkent’ International Film festival for the film Lasanda. In 1976, Perera won the award for the best director at OCIC film festival in Rome for Lasanda. In 1964, he wrote the screenplay and dialogues for the film Saravita, which was directed by Tissa Liyanasuriya. Later he received the award for Best Screenplay at the 1965 Sarasaviya Awards for this film. Among the popular programs that were started and produced by KAW during radio ceylon were Handa Mama for children, Radio Sagarawa for teenagers and Wasanawa Udawa for adult intelligence development. In 1966, he was censored from the radio, because it is strictly forbidden to engage in any activity related to the art of cinema during or outside the office hours of the radio. Therefore KAW and Karunaratne Abeysekera quit their permanent jobs and devoted themselves full time to cinema.

In 1972, he was a pioneer for the creation of the Sri Lanka film corporation.

Legacy
On 19 November 2013, a felicitation ceremony and three-day film festival was held at BMICH to celebrate Perera's contribution to Sinhala cinema.

Filmography

References

External links

Sri Lankan male film actors
Sinhalese male actors
1926 births
2006 deaths
Sinhalese writers
Sri Lankan screenwriters
Kala Suri
Alumni of Ananda College
20th-century screenwriters